In computer terminology, a Check Condition occurs when a SCSI device needs to report an error.  

SCSI communication takes place between an initiator and a target.  The initiator sends a command to the target which then responds.  SCSI commands are sent in a Command Descriptor Block (CDB).  At the end of the command the target returns a Status Code byte which is usually 00h for success, 02h for a Check Condition (error), or 08h for busy.  

When the target returns a Check Condition in response to a command, the initiator usually then issues a SCSI Request Sense command in order to obtain more information.  During the time between the reporting of a Check Condition and the issuing of a Request Sense command, the target is in a special state called a Contingent Allegiance Condition.

Check Condition